Allen Apsley may refer to:

Sir Allen Apsley (administrator) (1582–1630), English merchant, courtier and landowner, lord of the manor of Feltwell
Sir Allen Apsley (Royalist) (1616–1683), his son, Royalist in the English Civil War
Allen Bathurst, Lord Apsley (1895–1942), British Member of Parliament for Southampton and Bristol Central